Helen Nash may refer to:

 Helen Elizabeth Nash (1921–2012), first African-American doctor at the Saint Louis Children's Hospital
 Helen Nash (cellist), cellist for the electric string quartet Escala